Three Fables of Love is a 1962 internationally co-produced comedy film starring Leslie Caron, Anna Karina and Monica Vitti. It was shown as part of a retrospective on Italian comedy at the 67th Venice International Film Festival.

Cast
 Manuel Alexandre
 Ángel Álvarez
 Charles Aznavour as Charles (segment "Les deux pigeons")
 Alessandro Blasetti
 Xan das Bolas
 Alain Bouvette as Un collègue de Charles
 Rossano Brazzi as Leo
 Raymond Bussières as Le voleur (segment "Les deux pigeons")
 Leslie Caron as Annie (segment "Les deux pigeons")
 Ana Casares
 Hubert Deschamps as L'avocat
 Lola Gaos
 Anna Karina as Colombe
 Sylva Koscina as Mia
 Hardy Krüger
 Albert Michel as Un collègue de Charles
 Mario Passante as Le restaurateur
 Jean Poiret as Renard (segment "Le corbeau et le renard")
 Michel Serrault as Corbeau
 Gianrico Tedeschi as Valerio
 Monica Vitti as Madeleine

References

External links

1962 films
1962 comedy films
1960s French-language films
1960s Spanish-language films
French anthology films
French black-and-white films
Films directed by Alessandro Blasetti
Films directed by Hervé Bromberger
Films directed by René Clair
Films directed by Luis García Berlanga
Italian anthology films
Italian black-and-white films
Spanish anthology films
Spanish black-and-white films
Films with screenplays by Rafael Azcona
1960s multilingual films
French multilingual films
Italian multilingual films
Spanish multilingual films